WDCC may refer to:

 WDCC (FM), a radio station (90.5 FM) licensed to serve Sanford, North Carolina, United States
 Walt Disney Classics Collection